Madison Fain Barton (born April 28, 1972) is an American politician from Georgia. Barton is a Republican member of Georgia House of Representatives for District 5.

Personal life 
Barton's wife is Lynne Barton. They have two children. Barton and his family live in Calhoun, Georgia.

References

External links 
 Matt Barton at ballotpedia.org

Republican Party members of the Georgia House of Representatives
21st-century American politicians
Living people
1972 births